Lady of Secrets is a 1936 American drama film directed by Marion Gering and starring Ruth Chatterton, Otto Kruger and Lionel Atwill.

Plot
Celia Whittaker, a reclusive socialite who has long eschewed romantic opportunities, learns her younger sister Joan intends to marry David Eastman, an older author and professor, though she is truly in love with Richard, a fledgling doctor. Meeting David before learning he is her fiancee, she learns he is not fully in love with her either. Despite this circumstance, their domineering father insists on seeing the wedding go forward, to the point of attempting to have Celia confined to her home against her will. In a flashback, the roots of Celia's behavior of melancholy isolation are revealed.

Partial cast
 Ruth Chatterton as Celia Whittaker  
 Otto Kruger as David Eastman
 Lionel Atwill as Mr. Whittaker  
 Marian Marsh as Joan Whittaker
 Lloyd Nolan as Michael  
 Robert Allen as Richard Terrance
 Elisabeth Risdon as Mrs. Emily Whittaker
 Nana Bryant as Aunt Harriet
 Esther Dale as Miss Eccles

References

Bibliography
 James Monaco. The Encyclopedia of Film. Perigee Books, 1991.

External links
 

1936 films
1936 drama films
American drama films
Films directed by Marion Gering
Columbia Pictures films
American black-and-white films
1930s English-language films
1930s American films